Hoshizaki Castle was a Japanese castle in Minami-ku, Nagoya Japan.

The origins of the castle, such as the date of construction, are unknown. The Okada family were in the beginning the lords of the castle. In the 16th century the Yamaguchi family succeeded them and held the castle for generations until it was abandoned by Yamaguchi Shigemasa, who moved in 1588.

Today former parts of the castle are bisected by the Meitetsu railroad while another part houses a school.

A memorial stele out of stone marks the place where the castle used to stand.

References

External links 

Castles in Nagoya
Ruined castles in Japan